Polysaccharides, or polycarbohydrates, are the most abundant carbohydrates found in food. They are long-chain polymeric carbohydrates composed of monosaccharide units bound together by glycosidic linkages. This carbohydrate can react with water (hydrolysis) using amylase enzymes as catalyst, which produces constituent sugars (monosaccharides, or oligosaccharides). They range in structure from linear to highly branched. Examples include storage polysaccharides such as starch, glycogen and galactogen and structural polysaccharides such as cellulose and chitin.

Polysaccharides are often quite heterogeneous, containing slight modifications of the repeating unit. Depending on the structure, these macromolecules can have distinct properties from their monosaccharide building blocks. They may be amorphous or even insoluble in water.

When all the monosaccharides in a polysaccharide are the same type, the polysaccharide is called a homopolysaccharide or homoglycan, but when more than one type of monosaccharide is present, they are called heteropolysaccharides or heteroglycans.

Natural saccharides are generally composed of simple carbohydrates called monosaccharides with general formula (CH2O)n where n is three or more. Examples of monosaccharides are glucose, fructose, and glyceraldehyde. Polysaccharides, meanwhile, have a general formula of Cx(H2O)y where x is usually a large number between 200 and 2500.

As a rule of thumb, polysaccharides contain more than ten monosaccharide units, whereas oligosaccharides contain three to ten monosaccharide units, but the precise cutoff varies somewhat according to the convention. Polysaccharides are an important class of biological polymers. Their function in living organisms is usually either structure- or storage-related. Starch (a polymer of glucose) is used as a storage polysaccharide in plants, being found in the form of both amylose and the branched amylopectin. In animals, the structurally similar glucose polymer is the more densely branched glycogen, sometimes called "animal starch". Glycogen's properties allow it to be metabolized more quickly, which suits the active lives of moving animals. In bacteria, they play an important role in bacterial multicellularity.

Cellulose and chitin are examples of structural polysaccharides. Cellulose is used in the cell walls of plants and other organisms and is said to be the most abundant organic molecule on Earth. It has many uses such as a significant role in the paper and textile industries and is used as a feedstock for the production of rayon (via the viscose process), cellulose acetate, celluloid, and nitrocellulose. Chitin has a similar structure but has nitrogen-containing side branches, increasing its strength. It is found in arthropod exoskeletons and in the cell walls of some fungi. It also has multiple uses, including surgical threads. Polysaccharides also include callose or laminarin, chrysolaminarin, xylan, arabinoxylan, mannan, fucoidan and galactomannan.

Function

Structure 
Nutrition polysaccharides are common sources of energy. Many organisms can easily break down starches into glucose; however, most organisms cannot metabolize cellulose or other polysaccharides like cellulose, chitin, and arabinoxylans. Some bacteria and protists can metabolize these carbohydrate types. Ruminants and termites, for example, use microorganisms to process cellulose.

Even though these complex polysaccharides are not very digestible, they provide important dietary elements for humans. Called dietary fiber, these carbohydrates enhance digestion. The main action of dietary fiber is to change the nature of the contents of the gastrointestinal tract and how other nutrients and chemicals are absorbed. Soluble fiber binds to bile acids in the small intestine, making them less likely to enter the body; this, in turn, lowers cholesterol levels in the blood. Soluble fiber also attenuates the absorption of sugar, reduces sugar response after eating, normalizes blood lipid levels and, once fermented in the colon, produces short-chain fatty acids as byproducts with wide-ranging physiological activities (discussion below). Although insoluble fiber is associated with reduced diabetes risk, the mechanism by which this occurs is unknown.

Not yet formally proposed as an essential macronutrient (as of 2005), dietary fiber is nevertheless regarded as important for the diet, with regulatory authorities in many developed countries recommending increases in fiber intake.

Storage polysaccharides

Starch 

Starch is a glucose polymer in which glucopyranose units are bonded by alpha-linkages. It is made up of a mixture of amylose (15–20%) and amylopectin (80–85%). Amylose consists of a linear chain of several hundred glucose molecules, and Amylopectin is a branched molecule made of several thousand glucose units (every chain of 24–30 glucose units is one unit of Amylopectin). Starches are insoluble in water. They can be digested by breaking the alpha-linkages (glycosidic bonds). Both humans and other animals have amylases so that they can digest starches. Potato, rice, wheat, and maize are major sources of starch in the human diet. The formations of starches are the ways that plants store glucose.

Glycogen

Glycogen serves as the secondary long-term energy storage in animal and fungal cells, with the primary energy stores being held in adipose tissue. Glycogen is made primarily by the liver, and the muscles but can also be made by glycogenesis within the brain and stomach.

Glycogen is analogous to starch, a glucose polymer in plants, and is sometimes referred to as animal starch, having a similar structure to amylopectin but more extensively branched and compact than starch. Glycogen is a polymer of α(1→4) glycosidic bonds linked with α(1→6)-linked branches. Glycogen is found in the form of granules in the cytosol/cytoplasm in many cell types and plays an important role in the glucose cycle. Glycogen forms an energy reserve that can be quickly mobilized to meet a sudden need for glucose, but one that is less compact and more immediately available as an energy reserve than  triglycerides (lipids).

In the liver hepatocytes, glycogen can compose up to 8 percent (100–120 grams in an adult) of the fresh weight soon after a meal. Only the glycogen stored in the liver can be made accessible to other organs. In the muscles, glycogen is found in a low concentration of one to two percent of the muscle mass. The amount of glycogen stored in the body—especially within the muscles, liver, and red blood cells—varies with physical activity, basal metabolic rate, and eating habits such as intermittent fasting. Small amounts of glycogen are found in the kidneys and even smaller amounts in certain glial cells in the brain and white blood cells. The uterus also stores glycogen during pregnancy to nourish the embryo.

Glycogen is composed of a branched chain of glucose residues. It is stored in liver and muscles.
It is an energy reserve for animals.
It is the chief form of carbohydrate stored in animal organisms.
It is insoluble in water. It turns brown-red when mixed with iodine.
It also yields glucose on hydrolysis.

Galactogen 
Galactogen is a polysaccharide of galactose that functions as energy storage in pulmonate snails and some Caenogastropoda. This polysaccharide is exclusive of the reproduction and is only found in the albumen gland from the female snail reproductive system and in the perivitelline fluid of eggs. Furthermore, galactogen serves as an energy reserve for developing embryos and hatchlings, which is later replaced by glycogen in juveniles and adults.

Formed by crosslinking polysaccharide-based nanoparticles and functional polymers, galactogens have applications within hydrogel structures. These hydrogel structures can be designed to release particular nanoparticle pharmaceuticals and/or encapsulated therapeutics over time or in response to environmental stimuli. 

Galactogens are polysaccharides with binding affinity for bioanalytes. With this, by end-point attaching galactogens to other polysaccharides constituting the surface of medical devices, galactogens have use as a method of capturing bioanalytes (e.g., CTC's), a method for releasing the captured bioanalytes and an analysis method.

Inulin 

Inulin is a naturally occurring polysaccharide complex carbohydrate composed of fructose, a plant-derived food that human digestive enzymes cannot completely break down. The inulins belong to a class of dietary fibers known as fructans. Inulin is used by some plants as a means of storing energy and is typically found in roots or rhizomes. Most plants that synthesize and store inulin do not store other forms of carbohydrates such as starch. In the United States in 2018, the Food and Drug Administration approved inulin as a dietary fiber ingredient used to improve the nutritional value of manufactured food products.

Structural polysaccharides

Arabinoxylans 
Arabinoxylans are found in both the primary and secondary cell walls of plants and are the copolymers of two sugars: arabinose and xylose. They may also have beneficial effects on human health.

Cellulose 
The structural components of plants are formed primarily from cellulose. Wood is largely cellulose and lignin, while paper and cotton are nearly pure cellulose. Cellulose is a polymer made with repeated glucose units bonded together by beta-linkages.  Humans and many animals lack an enzyme to break the beta-linkages, so they do not digest cellulose.  Certain animals, such as termites can digest cellulose, because bacteria possessing the enzyme are present in their gut. Cellulose is insoluble in water. It does not change color when mixed with iodine. On hydrolysis, it yields glucose. It is the most abundant carbohydrate in nature.

Chitin 
Chitin is one of many naturally occurring polymers. It forms a structural component of many animals, such as exoskeletons. Over time it is bio-degradable in the natural environment. Its breakdown may be catalyzed by enzymes called chitinases, secreted by microorganisms such as bacteria and fungi and produced by some plants. Some of these microorganisms have receptors to simple sugars from the decomposition of chitin. If chitin is detected, they then produce enzymes to digest it by cleaving the glycosidic bonds in order to convert it to simple sugars and ammonia.

Chemically, chitin is closely related to chitosan (a more water-soluble derivative of chitin). It is also closely related to cellulose in that it is a long unbranched chain of glucose derivatives. Both materials contribute structure and strength, protecting the organism.

Pectins 
Pectins are a family of complex polysaccharides that contain 1,4-linked α--galactosyl uronic acid residues. They are present in most primary cell walls and in the nonwoody parts of terrestrial plants.

Acidic polysaccharides 

Acidic polysaccharides are polysaccharides that contain carboxyl groups, phosphate groups and/or sulfuric ester groups.

Polysaccharides containing sulfate groups can be isolated from algae or obtained by chemical modification.

Polysaccharides are major classes of biomolecules. They are long chains of carbohydrate molecules, composed of several smaller monosaccharides. These complex bio-macromolecules functions as an important source of energy in animal cell and form a structural component of a plant cell. It can be a homopolysaccharide or a heteropolysaccharide depending upon the type of the monosaccharides.

Polysaccharides can be a straight chain of monosaccharides known as linear polysaccharides, or it can be branched known as a branched polysaccharide.

Bacterial polysaccharides

Pathogenic bacteria commonly produce a thick, mucous-like, layer of polysaccharide. This "capsule" cloaks antigenic proteins on the bacterial surface that would otherwise provoke an immune response and thereby lead to the destruction of the bacteria.  Capsular polysaccharides are water-soluble, commonly acidic, and have molecular weights on the order of 100,000 to 2,000,000 daltons.  They are linear and consist of regularly repeating subunits of one to six monosaccharides.  There is enormous structural diversity; nearly two hundred different polysaccharides are produced by E. coli alone.  Mixtures of capsular polysaccharides, either conjugated or native, are used as vaccines.

Bacteria and many other microbes, including fungi and algae, often secrete polysaccharides to help them adhere to surfaces and to prevent them from drying out.  Humans have developed some of these polysaccharides into useful products, including xanthan gum, dextran, welan gum, gellan gum, diutan gum and pullulan.

Most of these polysaccharides exhibit useful visco-elastic properties when dissolved in water at very low levels. This makes various liquids used in everyday life, such as some foods, lotions, cleaners, and paints, viscous when stationary, but much more free-flowing when even slight shear is applied by stirring or shaking, pouring, wiping, or brushing. This property is named pseudoplasticity or shear thinning; the study of such matters is called rheology.

{| class="wikitable" style="text-align:right;"
|+ Viscosity of Welan gum
|-
! Shear rate (rpm)  
! Viscosity (cP or mPa⋅s)
|-
| 0.3  
| 23330
|-
| 0.5  
| 16000
|-
| 1  
| 11000
|-
| 2  
| 5500
|-
| 4  
| 3250
|-
| 5  
| 2900
|-
| 10  
| 1700
|-
| 20  
| 900
|-
| 50  
| 520
|-
| 100  
| 310
|}

Aqueous solutions of the polysaccharide alone have a curious behavior when stirred: after stirring ceases, the solution initially continues to swirl due to momentum, then slows to a standstill due to viscosity and reverses direction briefly before stopping. This recoil is due to the elastic effect of the polysaccharide chains, previously stretched in solution, returning to their relaxed state.

Cell-surface polysaccharides play diverse roles in bacterial ecology and physiology. They serve as a barrier between the cell wall and the environment, mediate host-pathogen interactions. Polysaccharides also play an important role in formation of biofilms and the structuring of complex life forms in bacteria like Myxococcus xanthus.

These polysaccharides are synthesized from nucleotide-activated precursors (called nucleotide sugars) and, in most cases, all the enzymes necessary for biosynthesis, assembly and transport of the completed polymer are encoded by genes organized in dedicated clusters within the genome of the organism. Lipopolysaccharide is one of the most important cell-surface polysaccharides, as it plays a key structural role in outer membrane integrity, as well as being an important mediator of host-pathogen interactions.

The enzymes that make the A-band (homopolymeric) and B-band (heteropolymeric) O-antigens have been identified and the metabolic pathways defined. The exopolysaccharide alginate is a linear copolymer of β-1,4-linked -mannuronic acid and -guluronic acid residues, and is responsible for the mucoid phenotype of late-stage cystic fibrosis disease. The pel and psl loci are two recently discovered gene clusters that also encode exopolysaccharides found to be important for biofilm formation. Rhamnolipid is a biosurfactant whose production is tightly regulated at the transcriptional level, but the precise role that it plays in disease is not well understood at present. Protein glycosylation, particularly of pilin and flagellin, became a focus of research by several groups from about 2007, and has been shown to be important for adhesion and invasion during bacterial infection.

Chemical identification tests for polysaccharides

Periodic acid-Schiff stain (PAS)

Polysaccharides with unprotected vicinal diols or amino sugars (where some hydroxyl groups are replaced with amines) give a positive periodic acid-Schiff stain (PAS). The list of polysaccharides that stain with PAS is long. Although mucins of epithelial origins stain with PAS, mucins of connective tissue origin have so many acidic substitutions that they do not have enough glycol or amino-alcohol groups left to react with PAS.

See also 
Glycan
Oligosaccharide nomenclature
Polysaccharide encapsulated bacteria

References

External links 

 Polysaccharide Structure
 European Polysaccharide Network of Excellence

 
Carbohydrate chemistry